Robert Harold Walston (October 17, 1928 – October 7, 1987) was an American football wide receiver and placekicker in the NFL for the Philadelphia Eagles.  He played college football at the University of Georgia and was drafted in the 14th round of the 1951 NFL Draft. From 1966 to 1967, he coached receivers and kickers for the Miami Dolphins.

Professional career
Walston doubled as receiver and kicker for the Eagles for 12 seasons. His best receiving season was in 1954, when he caught 41 passes for 750 yards, garnering 18.3 yards per reception, scoring five touchdowns. The next season, he would have only 581 yards on 31 receptions, but he scored 11 touchdowns as the Eagles once again went 7-4-1. He also scored 114 points during the season, the most in the NFL that season and most by an Eagle until 1984. His best kicking season was in 1957, when he made 75% of his field goals and was 1st in percentage in the league, with 9 of 12 field goals made. Despite this, his Eagles went 4-8. But three seasons later, they had made a resurgence in 1960, and Walston went 14 out of 20 in field goal kicking (70 percent) and was first in the league once again, with 39 out of 40 in extra points as the Eagles made their first playoff appearance since 1949. In his lone playoff appearance, he caught 3 passes for 38 yards while making a 17-yard field goal and two extra points as the Eagles won the 1960 NFL Championship Game, their first title since 1949. In his final season, the Eagles finished 3-10-1. He caught four touchdowns that season, his most since 1954, although his kicking game declined, as he had his second worst kicking percentage. 

Walston scored 881 points in his career, and at the time of his retirement had scored more points in the NFL than anyone other than Lou Groza. He retained the Eagles franchise points record until it was broken by kicker David Akers in 2007.

NFL career statistics

Coaching and administrative career
After working in the front office with the Eagles for a few years, he became the special teams coach of the Miami Dolphins for their inaugural 1966 season and the 1967 season. He also served as a personnel director for the Chicago Bears from 1968-1975, overseeing the drafting of college players along with scouting, and being an assistant to Bears president George Halas, Jr. He resigned on December 7, 1974, after Jim Finks became general manager. He later served as a scout for the Edmonton Eskimos in the Canadian Football League, from 1978-1980 and scouted for the United States Football League from 1983-1985. Walston is one of only four players named to the National Football League 1950s All-Decade Team not yet inducted in the Pro Football Hall of Fame. Walston died just 10 days before his 59th birthday, on October 7, 1987 at Alexian Brothers Medical Center, Elk Grove Village. Twenty-seven years after his death, he was named to the Philadelphia Sports Hall of Fame. He was inducted into the Eagles Hall of Fame on September 22, 2019.

References

External links

NY Times

Baseball Reference

1928 births
1987 deaths
Sportspeople from Columbus, Ohio
Players of American football from Columbus, Ohio
American football placekickers
American football wide receivers
Georgia Bulldogs football players
Philadelphia Eagles players
Eastern Conference Pro Bowl players
Miami Dolphins coaches
Chicago Bears executives
Edmonton Elks personnel
United States Football League executives
Statesboro Pilots players